Joe Chen Chiao-en (born 4 April 1979) is a Taiwanese actress, singer and television host.

Known as the "Queen of Idol Dramas", Chen is known for her roles in The Prince Who Turns into a Frog (2005), Fated to Love You (2008) and The Queen of SOP (2012). She was nominated at the 43rd Golden Bell Awards for her role in Fated to Love You.

In 2013, Chen's popularity rose in China, where she gained a large number of fans for her role as Dongfang Bubai in the Chinese wuxia series Swordsman. Chen also entered the Forbes China Celebrity 100 List for the first time. She solidified her popularity in highly rated television series Cruel Romance (2015), Destined to Love You (2015), Stay with Me (2016) and Candle in the Tomb (2016).

Chen ranked 99th on Forbes China Celebrity 100 list in 2013, 65th in 2014, 61st in 2015, and 51st in 2017.

Career

2001–2004: Beginnings
Joe Chen began working as a model and assistant in 2001. She entered the entertainment industry after winning 1st place on Sanlih E-Television's talent show. In 2002, she began her acting career by taking on a supporting role in the television drama, Lavender. She also became a host for SET variety shows Zhong Guo Na Me Da and Zong Yi Qi Jian, alongside famous Taiwanese hosts Jacky Wu and NONO.

After being neglected by her company for six months, she attracted the attention of SET's executive Zong Limei, who cast her in 100% Senorita (2003). This was her first leading role. The drama became the highest rated Taiwanese drama then, and also achieved moderate success overseas. Joe then make her debut in Taiwanese girl group 7 Flowers the following year.

2005–2012: Rising popularity 
Joe achieved breakthrough with her performance in The Prince Who Turns into a Frog (2005). The drama had a peak rating of 8.05, dethroning the previous record held by Meteor Garden to become the highest rated Taiwanese idol drama.

From 2006 to 2007, Joe began to host several Taiwanese variety programs like Treasure Hunter and Stylish Man – The Chef. She also starred in the dramas A Game About Love and Ying Ye 3 Jia 1.

In 2008, Joe starred in Fated to Love You opposite Ethan Juan, which beat Joe's previous drama, The Prince Who Turns into a Frog to become the highest rated Taiwanese idol drama. The drama also received popularity overseas, and was covered by America's Wall Street Journal. Joe was nominated for Best Actress in a TV Series at the 43rd Golden Bell Awards and was named "Queen of Idol Dramas" by Taipei Times.

In 2009, Joe was then cast in her first Chinese drama, The Girl in Blue, adapted from an online novel by Fei Wo Si Cun. The series was broadcast on Hunan TV in 2010.

In 2010, she was cast in her first film, Breaking the Waves, a youth sports film produced by John Woo for the Asian Games.

Joe returned to idol dramas after 4 years in the romantic comedy drama The Queen of SOP, which was broadcast on Hunan TV in 2012. The Queen of SOP achieved high ratings and positive reviews, further boosting Joe's popularity in China. She also released an OST for the drama titled "Like to be Lonely", which topped the Baidu Chinese Music Charts for two weeks.

2013–present: Breakthrough in China, Theater debut and continued success 
Joe rose to mainstream popularity in China after starring in the Chinese wuxia drama Swordsman, adapted from Louis Cha's novel The Smiling, Proud Wanderer. She portrayed the anti-heroine Dongfang Bubai. Though there were initial doubts to her characters (as Dongfang Bubai is a male in the original novel), Joe later won the hearts of the audience through her complex and rich portrayal of her character. Joe experienced a rise in popularity, and won the Most Popular Actress award at the 5th China TV Drama Awards.
The same year, Joe made her debut in musical theater, starring as the female lead in The Woman on the Breadfruit Tree, based on Amy Cheung's novel of the same name. She was nominated as Best New Actress at the 4th One Drama Presentation for her performance.

In 2014, Joe starred in The Monkey King, portraying Princess Iron Fan. The film was a huge commercial success, grossing US$180 million internationally. She also featured in the road-trip comedy film The Continent, directed by Han Han.

In 2015, Joe starred in her first period drama, Cruel Romance alongside Huang Xiaoming. Cruel Romance achieved high ratings and was extremely popular during its run.  
Joe won the Best Actress in the Modern drama award at the 17th Huading Awards for her performance. Joe then starred in another period drama, Destined to Love You, written by Tong Hua. The same year, Joe returned to theater and reprised her role in The Woman on the Breadfruit Tree. She received acclaim for her performance, and was awarded Best Actress at the 4th Denny Awards. She also made a cameo appearance in the popular youth film, Our Times as the adult version of the female protagonist.

In 2016, Joe paired up with Wang Kai for modern romance drama Stay with Me, which she co-produced. She co-starred with Jin Dong in the web drama Candle in the Tomb, adapted from the novel Ghost Blows Out the Light. Candle in the Tomb was a critical success, and received acclaim for its performance and faithful adaptation.

In 2017, Joe starred alongside Tong Dawei in the romance comedy drama Love Actually, which topped ratings and trending topics during its run. She subsequently returned to the big screen with two films – action comedy Big Brother alongside Donnie Yen and romance film Let's Cheat Together where she played the role of a mistress alongside frequent co-star Ming Dao.

In 2019, Joe starred alongside Chen Xiao in the historical television series Queen Dugu, playing the role of Dugu Qieluo. The same year, she was cast as Di Wu, a pilot in the aviation TV series New Horizon. However, due to the influence of COVID-19, New Horizon finally released in May. 27th, 2021 in iQiyi, Youku, and Tecent.

Personal life 
Chen is Taiwanese Hakka from Hsinchu County. She has two brothers, one elder and one younger.

Filmography

Film

Television series

Discography

Singles

Publication

Awards and nominations

References

External links

 
  
 

1979 births
Living people
Taiwanese film actresses
Taiwanese television actresses
Taiwanese television presenters
People from Hsinchu County
Taiwanese people of Hakka descent
Hakka musicians
Taiwanese idols
21st-century Taiwanese actresses
21st-century Taiwanese singers
21st-century Taiwanese women singers
Taiwanese women television presenters